Prashanth Chettuvatty Menon (born 18 January 1977 in Chavakkad, Kerala) is an Indian first class cricketer. He is a right handed lower order batsman and right arm fast medium bowler. He represents Kerala in Ranji Trophy. Together with Renjith Menon and Tinu Yohannan, Prashanth Menon formed a formidable pace trio, which revived the fortunes of the Kerala cricket team during the early 21st century.

Early years 
Prashanth was born in Chavakkad and brought up in Thrissur. He had completed his studies from St. Thomas College Thrissur where he was the Captain of the college cricket team.

Playing career 
With his consistent performance the state selectors picked him for the Kerala state team for the year 1998–99. Along with Former Indian pacer Tinu Yohannan and Renjith Menon he made lethal pace combination. Injuries and lack of form cut short what could have been a very promising career. He last represented Kerala Ranji team was back in 2004. Now Prashanth is working with Reserve Bank of India.

External links
Prashant Menon in Cricinfo
Prashant Menon in Cricket Online
Prasanth Menon KCA Archive 

Kerala cricketers
Living people
1977 births
People from Thrissur district
St. Thomas College, Thrissur alumni
Indian cricketers
Cricketers from Kerala